Almaz Special Anti-Terrorism Unit (SPBT Almaz) is an anti-terrorist special unit of the Ministry of Internal Affairs of Belarus.

History
The special-purpose detachment of the Ministry of Internal Affairs of the Byelorussian Soviet Socialist Republic "Berkut" was created on January 2, 1991 in accordance with the order of the Soviet Ministry of Internal Affairs of December 14, 1990. This was the first special unit of the Ministry of Internal Affairs on the territory of the republic. Initially, the "Berkut" detachment was subordinate to the Department for Execution of Punishments of the Ministry of Internal Affairs of the BSSR.

The first commander of the unit was the militia captain Uladzimir Navumau, then the commander of a patrol company.

In 1994, the commander of the "Berkut" Naumov put forward an initiative to reorganize and rename the special forces. In the fall of 1994, the unit was transformed into a special unit of the Ministry of Internal Affairs of Belarus with subordination to the minister personally and received a new name - "Almaz". The unit was assigned new tasks, including participation in the fight against organized criminal groups, the detention of especially dangerous and armed criminals.

In the first 15 years of its existence, SPBT Almaz was involved in combat missions 6383 times; conducted 4161 combat and special operations; freed 106 hostages; stopped a number of terrorist acts; detained 4559 criminals who committed grave and especially grave crimes; seized and defused 2,932 explosive devices; seized 464 units of firearms and 24386 pcs. ammunition, as well as 119,136 kg of drugs.

Tasks
The main tasks of the unit during this period were:

hostage rescue;
detention of armed criminals;
riot control in detention facilities.

References

Non-military counterterrorist organizations
Special forces of Belarus